Artatza Foronda is a hamlet located in the municipality of Vitoria-Gasteiz, in Álava province, Basque Country, Spain. It is part of the concejo of Legarda.

References

External links
 

Populated places in Álava